Nyman is an unincorporated community in Fremont Township, Page County, Iowa, United States.

History
Nyman's population was 22 in 1902, and was 50 in 1925.

References

Unincorporated communities in Page County, Iowa
Unincorporated communities in Iowa